The Waldheim Waltz is a 2018 Austrian documentary film directed by Ruth Beckermann. It was selected as the Austrian entry for the Best Foreign Language Film at the 91st Academy Awards, but it was not nominated.

Synopsis
Director Ruth Beckermann investigates the erasure of Austria's Nazi-era past by profiling U.N. Secretary General and Austrian President Kurt Waldheim, who once served in the German Wehrmacht.

See also
 List of submissions to the 91st Academy Awards for Best Foreign Language Film
 List of Austrian submissions for the Academy Award for Best Foreign Language Film

References

External links
 

2018 films
2018 documentary films
2010s German-language films
Austrian documentary films